The starspotted smooth-hound (Mustelus manazo) is a houndshark of the family Triakidae. It is found in east Asia and in the western Indian Ocean between latitudes 45° N and 10° S, from the surface to a depth of 360 m. The reproduction of this shark is ovoviviparous.

References

 
 

starspotted smooth-hound
Ovoviviparous fish
Fish of Kenya
Fish of the Indian Ocean
Marine fauna of East Asia
starspotted smooth-hound